Bat Trang is a commune (khum) of Mongkol Borei District in Banteay Meanchey Province in western Cambodia.

Villages

 Khtum Reay Lech
 Khtum Reay Kaeut
 Anlong Thngan Kaeut
 Anlong Thngan Lech
 Bang Bat Lech
 Bang Bat Kaeut
 Bat Trang
 Bat Trang Thum Lech
 Bat Trang Thum Kaeut
 Bang Bat Touch
 Preaek Chik

References

Communes of Banteay Meanchey province
Mongkol Borey District